Chikhalwadi is a village under Sangli district, Maharashtra, comprising 203 hectares. In 2011 the village had 1,019 inhabitants contained in 219 households.

References

Villages in Sangli district